Fay Gale AO (13 June 1932 – 3 May 2008) was an Australian cultural geographer and an emeritus professor. She was an advocate of equal opportunity for women and for Aboriginal people.

Background
She was born Gwendoline Fay Gilding in Balaklava, South Australia, to Jasper and Kathleen Gilding. Her father was a Methodist minister. Professor Gale was the first honours graduate in geography of the University of Adelaide. Professor Gale is notable for many academic works including the first-ever PHD to focus on Part Aboriginal people and address issues of assimilation. Her thesis A Study of Assimilation: Part Aborigines in South Australia was published in Adelaide in 1960 and republished in 1964 after becoming widely set as an anthropology text in numerous universities. She is widely revered for her contributions to academia and the role of women in academia.

In 1989, she was awarded Officer of the Order of Australia for "her services to social science, particularly in the fields of geography and Aboriginal studies". In 1978, she became the first woman to be appointed as professor at the University of Adelaide, in geography. In 1988, she became pro vice chancellor at the University of Adelaide and, in 1990, vice chancellor of the University of Western Australia. In 1997, she was appointed president of the Academy of the Social Sciences in Australia, the first woman to hold that position.

Gale was greatly influenced by her relationship with her foster-sister Edna Walker, a member of the Stolen Generation and was an early speaker and activist for change in the treatment of Aboriginal people. When she married Milton Gale in 1957 her two bridesmaids were Aboriginal women, Gladys Long and Linda Vale. Her early research activity amongst Aboriginal communities represents in many cases the only written records of some people. The research was part of a body of work relied upon by Hindmarsh Island Royal Commission in making its determination. This led to criticism by others of the veracity of the material. Rod Lucas discusses this treatment in 'The Failure of Anthropology'

During her time at The University of Western Australia Gale was instrumental in developing significant advances in gender equity.

In 1972 Gale was a visiting lecturer in the Geography School at Oxford University, having been awarded the Catherine Helen Spence Scholarship to travel overseas. In 1978 she was a visiting professor at the University of Washington.

In 1991 Gale teamed with Ian Lowe to give that year's Boyer Lectures entitled "Changing Australia (changes through technology)"

Gale considered Dame Roma Mitchell one of her key mentors.

Recognition 
She was the first woman pro-vice-chancellor, University of Adelaide, and the first vice-chancellor of the University of Western Australia.  This was the first appointment of a woman in WA and the second in Australia, but it was the first to either a sandstone or Group of Eight university. She was the first woman elected president of the Institute of Australian Geographers and the first woman elected president of the Australian Vice-Chancellors Committee. She was the first woman elected president of the Academy of the Social Sciences in Australia, having been elected Fellow in 1978. She was the first woman chair of the Festival of Perth Board. She was also the first woman elected to the council of the Association of Commonwealth Universities and the first woman elected president of the Association of Asian Social Science Research Councils. She was also the first woman elected patron of the Association of Tertiary Education Management, Australia and New Zealand.

The University of Western Australia offers a fellowship for academics wishing to study overseas in her name – Fay Gale Fellowships. The Academy of the Social Sciences in Australia has instituted (2008) The Fay Gale Annual Lecture which provides for a public lecture honouring a distinguished woman social scientist from among the Academy Fellows.

Rindos affair

Gale was involved in considerable controversy in the early to mid-1990s over activities in the anthropology department that became known as the "Rindos Affair" and ultimately made what The Times called "state history" by leading to an enquiry by the Legislative Council. As the university's first female vice chancellor, who was also single, Gale was the subject of considerable interest, and the elements of the case, involving academic rivalry and sexual exploits, captured the imagination of the press, with well over 100 news items being published. The background controversy was concerned with preferential homosexual and lesbian engagement between staff and selected students; and more generally over the disruption to their studies caused by radical changes wrought by the then Hawke Labor Government. Gale received both support and criticism from the academic staff.

Key appointments
President of the Australian Vice Chancellors Committee;
Vice-Chancellor of The University of Western Australia;
President of the Academy of the Social Sciences in Australia (1998–2000)
President of the Association of Asian Social Science Research Councils;
Patron of Academy of the Social Sciences in Australia (2001–2003);
Chair of the Festival of Perth Board of Management;
Chair of the West Australian Symphony Orchestra Advisory Board;
member of the council of the Association of Commonwealth Universities;
member of the Australian Research Council;
member of the Prime Ministers Science, Technology and Innovation Council;
Commissioner with the Australian Heritage Commission;
member of the National Committee of UNESCO;
Consultant Australian National Parks and Wild Life Service, NSW National Parks;
Consultant National Arthritis and Musculoskeletal Conditions Advisory Group, Department of Health and Ageing (Australia).
Sole woman professor, University of Adelaide, for almost a decade

Bibliography
Youth in Transition: The Challenges of Generational Change in Asia.; with Fahey, S.; Proceedings of the Biennial General Conference of the Association of Asian Social Science Research Councils; Canberra, 2005
Endurance ofAboriginal Women in Australia Habitus: A Sense of Place; Ashgate Pub, 2002
Making Space: Women and education at St Aloysius College, Adelaide, 1880–2000; editor; Wakefield Press, 2000
President's Column - Dialogue, Dialogue, 1999 
Where does Australian higher education need to go from here? University of New England, 1997
Tourism and the Protection of Aboriginal Cultural Sites with Jacobs, J.M.; Australian Heritage Commission, Australian Government Publishing Service Canberra, 1994
Cultural Geographies with Anderson, K.; Longman, 1992
Juvenile Justice: Debating the Issues with Naffine, N.; Wundersitz, J.; St. Leonards, Allen & Unwin, 1993
Inventing Places with Anderson, K.; Melbourne; Longman Cheshire; New York: Wiley, Halstead Press, 1992
Reforming the Law: Idealism versus Pragmatism with Naffine, N.; Wundersitz, J.; Adel. L. Rev., 1991
Aboriginal Youth and the Criminal Justice System: The Injustice of Justice with Bailey-Harris, R.J.; Wundersitz, J., Cambridge University Press, 1990
Aboriginal Youth and Juvenile Justice in South Australia with Wundersitz,J.; Bailey-Harris, R.J.; Aboriginal Law Bulletin, 1990 
Testing The Nexus: Crime, Gender and Unemployment with Ngaire, N.; The British Journal of Criminology 29:144–156, Centre for Crime & Justice Studies. 1989
Women in the Academic Search for Excellence with Lindemann, S.; Australian Universities, 1989
Chivalry, Justice or Paternalism?: The Female Offender in the Juvenile Justice System with Wundersitz, J. and Naffine N.; Journal of Sociology, 1988
Tourists and the national estate : procedures to protect Australia's heritage with Jacobs, J.M.; Canberra, AGPS, 1987
Identifying high-risk visitors at Aboriginal art sites in Australia with Jacobs, J.M.; Melbourne; Archaeological Publications, 1987
Aborigines and Europeans; Space and society, 1987
Aboriginal art - Australia's neglected inheritance with Jacobs, J.M.; World Archaeology, 1987
Disadvantage and Discretion: The Results for Aboriginal Youth in Relation to the Adjournment with Wundersitz,J.; Adelaide; Adel. L. Rev., 1987
Aboriginal Visibility in the 'System''' with Wundersitz, J.; Australian Social Work, 1986Rural and Urban Crime Rates Amongst Aboriginal Youth: Patterns of Different Locational Opportunity with Wundersitz, J.; Blackwell Synergy, 1986Monitoring visitor behaviour at rock art sites Rock art research Volume Number: 2, Issue Number: 2, 1985Kids & Court: The Increasing Costs of Legal Representation for Young Offenders with Wundersitz, J.; Aboriginal Law Bulletin, 1985 Report, Alice Springs Recreation Lake Vol. 1 with Lloyd,R.; Sitzler, M. Alice Springs, Board of Inquiry into Alice Springs..., 1984The protection of aboriginal rock art from tourists at Ubirr, Kakadu National Park; Visitors to aboriginal sites: access, control and management: proceedings of the 1983 Kakadu workshop, Australian National Parks and Wildlife Service; Canberra,1984We are Bosses Ourselves: The Status and Role of Aboriginal Today ; Australian Institute of Aboriginal Research; 1983Adelaide Aborigines: A Case Study of Urban Life, 1966–1981 with Wundersitz, J.; Australian National University. Development Studies Centre, Development Studies Centre, Australian National University: distributed by ANU Press, 1982Academic Staffing: The Search for Excellence; Vestes Volume 23, Issue 1 pp 3–8, 1980 A social geography of Aboriginal Australia; Australia: A Geography, 1978Race Relations in Australia: The Aborigines with Brookman, A.; McGraw-Hill, 1975Woman's Role in Aboriginal Society,Australian Institute of Aboriginal Studies,1974Urban Aborigines with Brookman, A.;Social Science Research Council of Australia Australian National University Press, 1972The Impact of Urbanization on Aboriginal Marriage Patterns;University of Western Australia Press, 1970Settlement & Encounter: Geographical Studies Presented to Sir Grenfell Price with Lawton, G.H.; Oxford University Press, 1969Foster Homes for Aboriginal Children Australian Social Work, Volume 21, Issue 1 March 1968, pages 8–14Patterns of Post-European Aboriginal Migration, Proceedings-Royal Geographical Society of Australasia. South Australian Branch, 1966Some Studies of Aborigines with Extensive European Associations ; Australian Aboriginal Studies: A Symposium of Papers ...,  – Published for the Australian Institute of Aboriginal Studies, 1963A study of assimilation: Part Aborigines in South Australia'' [PhD Thesis] University of Adelaide, 1960; Libraries Board of S.A., 1964

References

External links
 Fay Gale Obituary, Sydney Morning Herald (2008)
 

1932 births
2008 deaths
Australian geographers
Cultural geographers
People from Balaklava, South Australia
Women geographers
Academic staff of the University of Adelaide
Academic staff of the University of Western Australia
Fellows of the Academy of the Social Sciences in Australia
Officers of the Order of Australia
20th-century geographers